The 2022–23 Pro A season, known as Betclic Élite due to sponsorship from online gambling company Betclic, is the ongoing 101st season of the Pro A, the top basketball league in France organised by the Ligue Nationale de Basket (LNB). The regular season began on 23 September 2022 and is scheduled to complete on 17 May 2023. Via promotion and relegation with LNB Pro B, SLUC Nancy Basket and ADA Blois Basket 41 joined the league, replacing Orléans Loiret and Champagne Châlons Reims.

Format 
Different from previous seasons, the playoffs were played in a single-elimination format.

Teams

Locations and arenas

Regular season

League table

French clubs in European competitions

References

External links
Official website
Standings and statistics at Basketball-Reference.com

LNB Pro A seasons
French
Pro A
France